Olugbenga Olukemi Oduntan is an Anglican bishop in Nigeria: he is the current Bishop of Ajayii Crowther.

Notes

Living people
Anglican bishops of Ajayi Crowther
21st-century Anglican bishops in Nigeria
Year of birth missing (living people)